Finn Karsten Ramstad (born 21 May 1940) is a Norwegian jurist.

He graduated from the University of Oslo with the cand.jur. degree, and also has engineer education. From 1986 to 2000 he was the managing director of the employers' organisation Abelia, and from 2000 to 2004 he was vice director of the employers' organisation Norwegian Electricity Industry Association.

He resides in Asker.

References

1940 births
Living people
University of Oslo alumni
Norwegian jurists